The 1999–2000 Hofstra Flying Dutchmen basketball team represented Hofstra University from Hempstead, New York in the 1999–2000 season. Led by head coach Jay Wright, Hofstra finished with a record of 24–7, the best in the AEC, and won the AEC tournament. As a result of winning the tournament, Hofstra was invited to the NCAA tournament.

This was the final season that Hofstra's sports teams were known as the Flying Dutchmen and Flying Dutchwomen. In summer 2000, the school officially changed their nickname to the Pride.

Postseason results
AEC Tournament
3/4/00 @ Bob Carpenter Center, Newark, DE Vs. Boston U. W, 80–62
3/5/00 @ Bob Carpenter Center, Newark, DE Vs. Drexel W, 69–51
3/11/00 @ Mack Sports Complex, Hempstead, NY Vs. Delaware W, 76–69
NCAA Tournament
3/17/00 @ Marine Midland Arena, Buffalo, NY Vs. Oklahoma State L, 66–86

References

Hofstra Pride men's basketball seasons
Hofstra
Hofstra
1999 in sports in New York (state)
2000 in sports in New York (state)